Josefina de la Caridad Vidal Ferreiro (born 18 February 1961) is a Cuban diplomat, and has been the Cuban Ambassador to Canada since 28 March 2018 (http://www.cubanews.acn.cu/cuba/7923-josefina-vidal-presents-diplomatic-credentials-to-ottawa). Previously she was director general of the North American Division in the Ministry of Foreign Affairs since 2013.

Education
Vidal graduated from the Moscow State Institute of International Relations in 1984 with a degree of  Bachelor of International Relations.

Career
Vidal has previously held several United States-related posts in the Ministry of Foreign Affairs. From 1999 to 2003 she was First Secretary in the Cuban Interests Section in Washington, D.C., and from 1991 to 1997 she was an analyst at the Cuban Embassy in Paris, France.

Before entering diplomatic work she had been an Assistant Researcher in the Center of Studies of the United States at the University of Havana.

On 23 July 2017 Reuters reported that Vidal was to be transferred to the post of Cuban Ambassador to Canada, but  this was not reflected in official Cuban sources.

In August 2017 it was reported that Vidal had travelled to Moscow in late July for talks with Russian Deputy Foreign Minister Sergei Ryabkov and the Cuban Ambassador in Moscow Emilio Lozada Garcia.

References

1961 births
Living people
Moscow State Institute of International Relations alumni
Cuban women ambassadors